Frederick Julius Abbott (25 November 1901 – 4 May 1952) was a New Zealand-born English cricketer who played three first-class matches for Worcestershire: one in 1919 and two in 1920. He made his highest score, 42, on debut against Warwickshire in August 1919.
He also played for Malvern College.

Notes

References
 
 

English cricketers
Worcestershire cricketers
1901 births
1952 deaths
People educated at Malvern College